Taken (also titled 96 Hours and The Hostage) is a 2008 French English-language action-thriller film written by Luc Besson and Robert Mark Kamen, and directed by Pierre Morel. It stars Liam Neeson, Maggie Grace, Famke Janssen, Katie Cassidy, Leland Orser, and Holly Valance. Neeson plays Bryan Mills, an ex-CIA officer who sets about tracking down his teenage daughter Kim (Grace) and her best friend Amanda (Cassidy) after the two girls are kidnapped by Albanian human traffickers while traveling in France during a vacation.

Taken was released in France on 27 February 2008 by EuropaCorp, and later in the United States on 30 January 2009 by 20th Century Fox. The movie  grossed more than $226 million. Despite mixed reviews from critics, numerous media outlets cited the film as a turning point in Neeson's career that redefined and transformed him to an action film star. It is the first film in the Taken franchise and was followed by two sequels—Taken 2 and Taken 3—released in 2012 and 2014, respectively. A television series premiered in 2017 on NBC, with Clive Standen portraying a younger Bryan Mills.

Plot

Ex-Green Beret and ex-CIA officer Bryan Mills attempts to build a closer relationship with his 17-year-old daughter, Kim, who lives with her mother (his ex-wife) Lenore, and her wealthy stepfather, Stuart. While overseeing security at a concert for pop star Sheerah, Bryan saves her from a knife-wielding attacker. Out of gratitude, Sheerah offers to have a vocal coach assess Kim as a singer. Before Bryan can tell her about the offer, Kim asks him for permission to travel to Paris with her best friend, Amanda. He initially refuses, concerned about her safety, but eventually gives in. At the airport, Bryan learns that Kim lied; the girls are actually planning to follow U2 during their European tour.

Upon arriving at Charles de Gaulle Airport, Kim and Amanda meet Peter, a handsome young stranger who offers to share a taxi. Kim and Amanda go to Amanda's cousins' apartment, where Kim learns that the cousins are in Spain. After answering a call from Bryan, Kim sees men enter the apartment and abduct Amanda. When Kim is dragged out from hiding, she yells a description of her abductor, following her father's instructions. Bryan hears someone breathing on the phone and tells the listener that he will not pursue the kidnappers if they release his daughter, but warns them that refusing to accept his offer will result in their deaths. The listener only replies "good luck" and terminates the call.

Sam, an old friend and former colleague of Bryan, deduces that the kidnappers are part of an Albanian sex trafficking ring and identifies the listener as mob boss Marko Hoxha. Based on previous abductions, Kim must be found within 96 hours or she will likely be lost forever. Bryan flies to Paris, breaks into the apartment, and finds Peter's reflection in a picture on Kim's phone. He finds Peter at the airport, trying to charm a female traveler. Bryan gives chase in a stolen taxi. While fleeing, Peter is struck and killed by an oncoming truck. With his only lead dead, Bryan turns to an old contact, ex-DGSE Agent turned National Police officer Jean-Claude Pitrel, who now has a desk job. Jean-Claude warns him not to get involved, but informs him of the local red-light district where Bryan plants a listening device on an Albanian pimp. Bryan searches a makeshift brothel in a construction yard and rescues a drugged young woman who has Kim's denim jacket. After a gunfight and high-speed chase with the brothel's operators, Bryan takes the woman to a hotel, where he improvises her detoxification.

The next morning, the woman tells Bryan of a house where she and Kim were kept. Posing as Jean-Claude, Bryan enters the house under the pretense of renegotiating the police protection rate. When he identifies Marko by tricking him into saying "good luck," the meeting erupts into a fight which results in the deaths of several gangsters. Searching the house, Bryan finds several heavily drugged girls, including Amanda who died of an overdose. Bryan then tortures Marko with electricity, forcing him to confess that virgins like Kim are quickly sold on the black market. Marko identifies the buyer as crime syndicate leader Patrice Saint-Clair before Bryan leaves him to die from continuous electrocution.

At Jean-Claude's apartment, Bryan confronts the police official over his corruption and shoots his wife, wounding her, to coerce him into disclosing Saint-Clair's location, before knocking him out. Bryan infiltrates a secret sex-slave auction taking place beneath Saint-Clair's mansion, where Kim is the subject of the last sale. Bryan forces Ali, one of the bidders, to purchase her, but is subsequently caught and knocked out. When Saint-Clair learns who he is, he orders his henchmen to kill Bryan, but Bryan breaks loose and kills them all. Saint-Clair reveals that Kim was taken to a yacht owned by a sheikh named Raman before Bryan murders him.

Bryan pursues the yacht and eliminates the bodyguards, including Ali, before he finds Raman holding Kim at knifepoint. When Raman attempts to negotiate, Bryan kills him with a headshot. Back in the United States, Bryan surprises Kim by taking her to visit Sheerah.

Cast

 Liam Neeson as Bryan Mills
 Maggie Grace as Kim Mills
 Famke Janssen as Lenore Mills-St John
 Katie Cassidy as Amanda
 Leland Orser as Sam Gilroy
 Jon Gries as Mark Casey
 David Warshofsky as Bernie Harris
 Holly Valance as Sheerah
 Xander Berkeley as Stuart St John
 Olivier Rabourdin as Jean-Claude Pitrel
 Gérard Watkins as Patrice Saint-Clair
 Arben Bajraktaraj as Marko Hoxha
 Camille Japy as Isabelle
 Nicolas Giraud as Peter
 Goran Kostić as Gregor
  as Raman
  as Ali

Production
The film was produced by Luc Besson's EuropaCorp. Pierre Morel had previously worked as a director of photography for Besson, and they had also collaborated on Morel's directorial debut, District 13. Besson pitched the idea of Taken one night over dinner and Morel immediately became attached to the idea of a father fighting to protect his daughter. Jeff Bridges was first cast as Bryan Mills, but after he dropped out of the project, Liam Neeson accepted the part, desiring to play a more physically demanding role than he was used to. Neeson at first thought the film to be no more than a "little side road" for his career, expecting it to be released directly to video. Instead, the film went on to define Neeson's career and establish him as a big time actor.

Music
The score of the film was composed by Nathaniel Méchaly and released on 27 January 2009.

Soundtrack
All songs written and composed by Nathaniel Méchaly except where noted.

Reception
A trailer of Taken was released on 20 June 2008. The film saw its release on 27 February in France, 9 April in China and 26 September in UK in the year of 2008. It was released on 30 January in United States and 22 August in Japan in the year of 2009. The film was released under the title of 96 Hours in Germany, Io vi troverò (I Will Find You) in Italy and Заложница (Hostage) in Russia.

Box office 

Taken grossed $145 million in North America and $81.8 million in other territories, for a worldwide total of $226.8 million, against a production budget of $25 million.

On its opening day in North America, the film grossed $9.4 million, scoring the best opening day ever for Super Bowl weekend. It went on to make $24.7 million during its opening weekend playing in 3,183 theaters, with a $7,765 per-theatre average and ranking #1, which was the second highest Super Bowl opening weekend, at the time, behind Hannah Montana and Miley Cyrus: Best of Both Worlds Concert ($31.1 million). The film is also the highest grossing among the Taken films in North America.

The biggest markets in other territories were South Korea, UK, France, Australia and Spain: the film grossed $15.47 million, $11.27 million, $9.43 million, $6.28 million, and $5.46 million respectively.

Critical response
On Rotten Tomatoes, the film has a rating of 59%, based on 177 reviews, with an average rating of 5.80/10. The site's critical consensus reads, "Taken is undeniably fun with slick action, but is largely a brainless exercise." On Metacritic, the film has a score of 50 out of 100, based on 32 critics, indicating "mixed or average reviews".

Roger Ebert of the Chicago Sun-Times gave the film two and a half stars out of four, writing, "It's always a puzzle to review a movie like this. On the one hand, it's preposterous. But who expects a "Bourne"-type city-wrecking operative to be plausible? On the other hand, it's very well-made. Liam Neeson brings the character a hard-edged, mercilessly focused anger, and director Pierre Morel hurtles through action sequences at a breathless velocity." Richard Corliss of Time said the film "has nothing more on its mind than dozens of bad guys getting beat up and another one turned into instant roadkill." The Washington Post described the film as "a satisfying little thriller as grimly professional as its efficient hero" and likened the action to the Bourne film series. Derek Elley of Variety described the film as a "kick ass, pedal-to-the-metal actioner [...] that wisely doesn't give the viewer any time to ponder the string of unlikely coincidences [...] the film has the forward, devil-may-care momentum of a Bond film on steroids."

Kenneth Turan of the Los Angeles Times described the film's premise as "unintentionally silly at times [...] Obviously, 'Taken' is not the kind of action film to spend much time worrying about its pedestrian script or largely indifferent acting, so it's fortunate to have Neeson in the starring role." Bryan Mills is characterized as "relentless attack machine who is impervious to fists, bullets and fast-moving cars, he uses a variety of martial arts skills to knock out more opponents than Mike Tyson and casually kill those he doesn't KO".

Audiences polled by CinemaScore gave the film an average grade of "A−" on an A+ to F scale.

Controversy
In 2011, a self-proclaimed counter-terrorism expert was convicted of wire fraud after claiming the film was based on a real-life incident in which his daughter was killed. William G. Hillar, who pretended to be a retired Green Beret colonel, claimed to have spent more than 12 years lecturing US government agencies such as the Federal Bureau of Investigation on security issues. However, records revealed he had actually been a radar operator in the Coast Guard Reserve between 1962 and 1970, and had never been in the US Army. Nevertheless, his website claimed Taken was based on events involving him and his family. Hillar, who admitted the charges, was sentenced to 500 hours of community service at Maryland State Veteran Cemeteries. He also agreed to repay $171,000 in speaking fees that he had received from various organizations to which he had presented himself as an expert in terrorism and human trafficking.

In 2019, in an attempt to promote tourism and counter the negative perception of Albanians in the Western media, the Albanian government, together with foreign donors, produced a tourism advertisement entitled "Be Taken by Albania", where Liam Neeson is asked to visit Albania and explore the country's cultural, culinary and tourism hotspots.

Awards

Home media
Taken was released as "Taken (Single-Disc Extended Edition)" on DVDs on 12 May 2009 and on Blu-ray on 9 December 2014. The film also saw release of "Taken (Two-Disc Extended Edition)" on DVDs and Blu-ray Discs on 12 May 2009. , the film has sold 5,388,963 DVDs and 607,073 Blu-ray Discs and grossing $79,798,171 and $10,069,116 respectively totaling $89,867,287 in North America.

In popular culture
 After the film was released, the “Taken Speech” that Neeson's character gave while talking on the phone with his daughter's kidnappers became an Internet meme.
 In May 2012, the plot of "Leggo My Meg-O", the twentieth episode of the tenth season of the TV series Family Guy, is based on Taken. In "Brian's a Bad Father", Brian mentions that having Zooey Deschanel cast as the daughter in Taken would be thinking outside the box. A cutaway gag then depicts Bryan Mills (reprised by Liam Neeson) instructing the kidnappers to send him the head of Zooey Deschanel.
 In "Hunt", a fifth-season episode of the TV series Castle, when Richard Castle's daughter Alexis is kidnapped and taken to Paris, Castle follows and Det. Kevin Ryan asks, "Who does he think he is, Liam Neeson?"
 A Saturday Night Live opening sketch on 8 March 2014 (season 39, episode 15) featured Liam Neeson reprising his character from the film in response to Vladimir Putin's invasion of Ukraine and in defense of President Obama.
 In the animated Cartoon Network series, The Amazing World of Gumball episode "The Kids", Gumball calls Mr. Fitzgerald and asks if he can talk to Penny, Mr. Fitzgerald then assumes Gumball is being disrespectful due to his changing voice, and threatens Gumball by repeating Bryan Mills' phone speech in a scary voice. Later in the episode, Mr. Fitzgerald drives up to Gumball from his car and says the Bryan Mills line to him once more, but he is quickly cut off by Gumball when he rolls up his car window, locks the door, and slams it shut in his face.
 In Lego Dimensions, when Bad Cop (voiced by Liam Neeson, despite his lines being archive audio from The Lego Movie) interacts with Unikitty, Unikitty says “I have a very particular set of skills, Bad Cop… and they’re sure to give you HAPPY THOUGHTS!”, which is a joke on how Bad Cop is played by Liam Neeson, who also does that speech. 
 One of the most popular and well-received commercials of Super Bowl XLIX in February 2015, an ad by Finnish game developer Supercell for its popular game Clash of Clans, featured Neeson parodying his character from Taken.
 In "Red Means Stop", the finale episode of the sixth season of The Venture Bros., The Monarch and Henchman 21 trick Red Death's family into going to his mother-in-law's and call him claiming to have kidnapped them. Before he could finish his speech, Red Death quotes Neeson's "I will find you" speech. The Monarch apologises and slowly hangs up then start to cower for a few seconds.
 Liam Neeson's iconic line from the movie is parodied in Broforce as there is an achievement for beating the main campaign on Hard difficulty called “A very particular set of skills”, which is a reference to said line.
 In Lego Star Wars: The Skywalker Saga, Neeson's iconic line is referenced. "I have a very particular set of skills, that should come in handy here." can sometimes be said by Qui-Gon Jinn when encountering a puzzle. (Neeson played Qui-Gon in Star Wars: Episode I - The Phantom Menace)

Sequels
In November 2010, Fox announced that EuropaCorp would produce a sequel directed by Olivier Megaton. Taken 2 was subsequently released in France on 3 October 2012, with Neeson, Janssen, Grace, Gries, Rabourdin and Orser reprising their roles from the first film. A third Taken film was released 16 December 2014.

Television series

In September 2015, NBC ordered a TV series depicting a younger Bryan Mills with Clive Standen portraying Mills, Gaius Charles, Monique Gabriela Curnen, James Landry Hebert, Michael Irby, Jose Pablo Cantillo, Jennifer Marsala and Simu Liu are cast as John, Vlasik, Casey, Scott, Dave, Riley and Faaron, members of OPCON. Brooklyn Sudano is cast as Asha, an attractive, well-educated young student from an upper-middle-class family who is furthering her education when she first meets Bryan, and Jennifer Beals is cast as Christina Hart, the Special Deputy Director of National Intelligence who has taken Mills under her wing. Alexander Cary is a writer, executive producer and showrunner for the series and Alex Graves directed the pilot. The show lasted two seasons, beginning in February 2017 and ending in June the following year.

References

External links

 
 

Taken (franchise)
2008 films
2008 action thriller films
20th Century Fox films
Albanian Mafia
French action thriller films
American action thriller films
EuropaCorp films
Films about child abduction in France
Films about organized crime in France
Films about prostitution in Paris
Films about human trafficking
Works about sex trafficking
Films directed by Pierre Morel
Films set in Los Angeles
Films set in Paris
Films shot in France
Films shot in Los Angeles
Human trafficking in France
French vigilante films
Films produced by Luc Besson
Films scored by Nathaniel Méchaly
Films with screenplays by Luc Besson
Films with screenplays by Robert Mark Kamen
English-language French films
Films about father–daughter relationships
2000s English-language films
2000s American films
2000s French films